Ruthika is an Indian actress  who has acted in more than 50 movies in Telugu, Tamil, Kannada, Hindi, Malayalam languages.

Filmography

6 Teens (2001)
Akasa Veedhilo (2001)
Snehamante Idera (2001)
Eduruleni Manishi (2001)
Friends (2002 film)
Santosham (2002)
Girl Friend (2002)
Manmadhudu(2002)
Katthegalu Saar Katthegalu (2003)
Laali Haadu (2003)
Shivamani (2003)
Sorry Naaku Pellaindi (2004)
Xtra (2004)
Nenunnanu(2004)
Shankar Dada M.B.B.S. (2004)
Jai Chiranjeeva (2005)
Sarada Saradaga (2006)
Vikramarkudu (2006)
Stalin (2006)
Thrill (2006)
Lava Kusha (2007)
Premabhishekam (2008)
John Appa Rao 40 Plus (2008)
Blade Babji (2008)
Jolly Days (2009)
Sorry Maa Aayana Intlo Unnadu (2010)

References 

Living people
1989 births
Indian film actresses
Actresses in Tamil cinema
Actresses in Telugu cinema
Actresses in Kannada cinema